The Sihcao Wetlands are wetlands in Annan District, Tainan, Taiwan.

The protected area in Taiwan consists of mangrove swamps, salt marshes, rivers, canals, and drainage ditches. It is located in Tainan City's Annan District, and consists of the area bounded by the southeastern side of the Luermen River, the southwestern side of Xi-Bin Road, and the northern side of the Yan-Shui River. Nearby is the Tainan Salt Pan Eco-village (台南市鹽田生態文化村).

In November 2004, the Sihcao Wildlife Refuge (四草野生動物保護區) was created to further protect the area, especially from possible encroachment from the nearby Tainan Technology Industrial Park.

On 10 December 2007, the Sihcao Wetlands, along with the Zengwun Estuary Wetland, also in Taiwan  (曾文溪口濕地) were listed as international wetlands under the Ramsar Convention.

In 2009, the Sihcao Wetlands became part of the Taijiang National Park.

See also
 Banping Lake Wetland ParkThis is in Taiwan.
 Gaomei Wetlands

References

1994 establishments in Taiwan
Landforms of Tainan
Ramsar sites in Taiwan
Wetlands of Taiwan